Lucas Luis Dónnelly (29 July 1921 – 31 August 2012) was an Argentine Prelate of Roman Catholic Church.

Dónnelly was born in General Cabrera, Argentina and was ordained a priest on December 21, 1946. He was a member of the religious order Our Lady of Mercy. Dónnelly was appointed Bishop of the Prelature of Deán Funes December 30, 1980 and ordained January 6, 1981. Dónnelly was installed Prelate of Deán Funes on March 14, 1981 and would serve for nearly twenty years until retirement on January 18, 2000

See also
Territorial Prelature of Deán Funes

External links
Catholic-Hierarchy
Our Lady of Mercy

20th-century Roman Catholic bishops in Argentina
21st-century Roman Catholic bishops in Argentina
1921 births
2012 deaths
Roman Catholic bishops of Deán Funes